Ali Odabas (born 20 October 1993) is a German-Turkish professional footballer who plays as a centre-back for VfR Aalen.

Club career
In July 2015, Odabas moved to Jahn Regensburg on a free transfer. He made his competitive debut for the club on 16 July 2015 in a 3–2 home victory over Viktoria Aschaffenburg. In July 2016, Odabas tore the cruciate ligament in his right knee in a friendly with FC Sopron. In June 2017, he extended his contract with Regensburg until 30 June 2019 and was loaned out for one season to FSV Zwickau. He only made two league appearances during his time at Zwickau, one in a 1–1 draw with Sportfreunde Lotte on 29 July 2017 and the other in a 1–0 defeat to Würzburg on 27 August 2017.

References

External links
 

1993 births
Living people
People from Schwäbisch Gmünd
Sportspeople from Stuttgart (region)
German people of Turkish descent
Turkish footballers
German footballers
Turkish expatriate footballers
Turkish expatriate sportspeople in Germany
Association football defenders
SSV Jahn Regensburg players
SSV Jahn Regensburg II players
FSV Zwickau players
VfR Aalen players
Regionalliga players
3. Liga players
Footballers from Baden-Württemberg